Wajir County is a county in the former North Eastern Province of Kenya. Its capital and largest town is Wajir. The county is bordered to the north by Ethiopia, to the northeast by Mandera County, to the east by Somalia, to the south by Garissa County, to the west by Isiolo County and to the northwest by Marsabit County. The county has six constituencies: Wajir South, Tarbaj, Wajir North, Wajir West, Wajir East, and Eldas.

Geography and climate 
The county consists of a featureless plain that rises from around 150 metres (492 ft) above sea level in the south and east to 400 metres (1312 ft) in the north. The area is prone to seasonal flooding as well as seasonal swamps. Wajir county has a semi-arid climate with annual rainfall of around 240 mm (9.44 in).

Population

County subdivisions

Sub-counties
As of 2019, Wajir County is divided into 7 sub-counties:

Divisions
Wajir County is divided into fourteen administrative divisions:

References

Wajir County Governor is "FCPA H.E Ahmed Abdullahi Mohamed" having been duly elected on 9 August 2022 for the second term as the pioneer Governor of Wajir County.-

 
Counties of Kenya
Somali-speaking countries and territories